Charles Victor Cherbuliez (19 July 1829 – 1 or 2 July 1899) was a Swiss, and then (1879) French novelist and author. He was born at Geneva, Switzerland and died at Combs-la-Ville. He was the eleventh member elected to occupy seat 3 of the Académie française in 1881.

Biography
Cherbuliez was born at Geneva, where his father, André Cherbuliez (1795–1874), was a classical professor at the Université de Genève. He was descended from a family of Protestant refugees, and many years later Victor Cherbuliez resumed his French nationality, taking advantage of an act passed in the early days of the Revolution. Geneva was the scene of his early education; thence he proceeded to Paris, and afterwards to the universities of Bonn and Berlin.

Cherbuliez returned to his native town and engaged in the profession of teaching. After his resumption of French citizenship he was elected a member of the Académie française (1881), and having received the Légion d'honneur in 1870, he was promoted to be officer of the order in 1892.

Work
Cherbuliez was a voluminous and successful writer of fiction. His first book, originally published in 1860, reappeared in 1864 under the title of Un Cheval de Phidias: it is a romantic study of art in the golden age of Athens. He went on to produce a series of novels.

Most of these novels first appeared in the Revue des deux mondes, to which Cherbuliez also contributed a number of political and learned articles, usually printed with the pseudonym G Valbert. Many of these have been published in collected form under the titles L'Allemagne politique (1870), L'Espagne politique (1874), Profils étrangers (1889), L'Art et la nature (1892), etc. The volume Etudes de littérature et d'art (1873) includes articles for the most part reprinted from Le Temps.

Assessment
According to Robert Crewe-Milnes in the Encyclopædia Britannica Eleventh Edition:

Bibliography

Le Comte Kostia (1863)
Le Prince Vitale (1864)
Le roman d'une honnête femme (1866)
L'aventure de Ladislas Bolski (1869)
Miss Rovel (1875)
Samuel Brohl et Cie (1877)
L'idée de Jean Téterol (1878)
Noirs et rouges (1881)
La vocation du comte Ghislain (1888)
Une gageure (1890)
Le Secret du précepteur (1893)
Jacquine Vanesse (1898)

References

External links

 
 
 

1829 births
1899 deaths
Writers from Geneva
French Protestants
Members of the Académie Française
University of Bonn alumni
Officiers of the Légion d'honneur
19th-century French novelists
French male novelists
Members of the Ligue de la patrie française
19th-century French male writers